The following list shows NCAA Division I-A football programs by winning percentage during the 1980-1989 football seasons. The following list reflects the records according to the NCAA. This list takes into account results modified later due to NCAA action, such as vacated victories and forfeits. This list only takes into account games played while in Division I-A.

 

 Chart notes

 The Ivy League, Southern Conference, and Southland Conference moved from Division I-A to I-AA after the 1981 season.
 The Missouri Valley Conference stopped supporting football after the 1985 season.
 Tennessee State left Division I-A after the 1980 season.
 Villanova left Division I-A after the 1980 season.
 Louisiana-Lafayette went by the name Southwestern Louisiana until 1999.
 Akron joined Division I-A in 1987.
 Louisiana Tech left Division I-A after the 1981 season with the Southland Conference, and then rejoined Division I-A in 1988.
 Wichita State left Division I-A after the 1986 season.
 William & Mary left Division I-A after the 1983 season.
 North Texas left Division I-A after the 1982 season.
 Richmond left Division I-A after the 1983 season.

See also
 NCAA Division I FBS football win–loss records
 NCAA Division I football win–loss records in the 1970s
 NCAA Division I-A football win–loss records in the 1990s

References

Lists of college football team records